The Butte County High Point is on Robert Jenkins mountain ridge located on the boundary between Butte and Plumas counties in the Sierra Nevada of California.

The ridge, located close to Lost Lake and Humboldt Peak, has an elevation of about 7,124+ feet (2,171+ m) at the county line. It can be found by taking Mary's trail. Due to its elevation the ridge receives considerable snowfall during the winter.

References

External links
 

Landforms of Butte County, California
Landforms of Plumas County, California
Landforms of the Sierra Nevada (United States)
Ridges of California